Goren (lit. Granary) is a moshav in northern Israel. Located in the Western Galilee near Ma'alot-Tarshiha, it falls under the jurisdiction of Ma'ale Yosef Regional Council.

History
The moshav was established in 1950 by immigrants from Yemen after they had spent a few months living in Rosh HaAyin. The founders were joined by immigrants from North Africa in 1951. Its name is a Hebraized version of the Arabic name for the area.

It is located on the  land that had belonged to the  Palestinian  village of Iqrit, as its inhabitants had been expelled.

References

Moshavim
Populated places established in 1950
Populated places in Northern District (Israel)
Yemeni-Jewish culture in Israel
1950 establishments in Israel